Mark Russell (born 22 March 1996) is a Scottish professional footballer who plays as a left midfielder for NIFL Premiership side Portadown.

He began his career with Greenock Morton and made over 100 appearances for them, spending a short spell with Falkirk before spending two years playing in Ireland for Finn Harps.

Early life
Born in Paisley, Russell attended Gleniffer High School.

Club career
Russell moved into the professional game when he signed a full-time contract with Greenock Morton in the Scottish Championship as part of their new development squad.

He made his début for the club as an injury time substitute for Dougie Imrie in November 2013.

In June 2014, Russell signed a new two-year development squad contract with Morton.

Russell was included in the PFA Scotland League One Team of the Year for 2014-15 along with teammate Declan McManus.

In Autumn 2015, Russell rejected a new contract offer from Morton. A second offer was made, which Russell accepted in December 2015.

In June 2017, Russell signed up for a further season with the club.

Falkirk
He left Morton in June 2018 in search of a new challenge, signing a six-month contract with rival Championship club Falkirk. After making just four appearances for Falkirk, he was released by the club in January 2019.

Finn Harps
Shortly after leaving Falkirk, Russell trialled with League of Ireland Premier Division side Finn Harps, earning himself a one year deal at the Irish club. He featured in 29 games for the club, scoring one goal in the relegation play-offs, as Harps retained their place in the Premier Division.

Following speculation around his future, he signed a new one year extension for the 2020 season in January 2020.

2020 saw Russell having a successful season with Finn Harps. In the shortened 18 game season, due to the Covid-19 pandemic, Russell scored three times as the Donegal side recorded their highest league finish in twenty years, with Russell playing a number of games as a support striker. In turn, he finished as the clubs top league goalscorer. The season ended in disappointment, however, as Harps were controversially beaten by Shamrock Rovers in the FAI Cup quarter final.

Russell signed on for a further year at Harps in January 2021, marking his third season in succession with the club.

Return to Greenock Morton
On 22 June 2021, Russell returned to Greenock Morton after a three-year spell away from the club.

Galway United
On 2 July 2022, he signed for League of Ireland First Division side Galway United until the end of the season. He made his debut on 8 July, coming off the bench for the last 5 minutes of a 3–0 win over Cobh Ramblers in what proved to be his only appearance for the club.

Portadown
Just one month later, on 4 August 2022 Russell moved club again, this time signing for NIFL Premiership club Portadown.

Career statistics

Honours
Morton
Scottish League One: Winners 2014–15
PFA Scotland League One Team of the Year: 2014–15

See also
Greenock Morton F.C. season 2013–14 | 2014–15 | 2015–16

References

External links

1996 births
Association football defenders
Association football midfielders
Falkirk F.C. players
Greenock Morton F.C. players
Finn Harps F.C. players
League of Ireland players
Galway United F.C. players
Portadown F.C. players
Expatriate association footballers in the Republic of Ireland
Living people
Scottish footballers
Scottish Professional Football League players
Footballers from Paisley, Renfrewshire